In mathematics, a cusp neighborhood is defined as a set of points near a cusp singularity.

Cusp neighborhood for a Riemann surface
The cusp neighborhood for a hyperbolic Riemann surface can be defined in terms of its Fuchsian model.
 
Suppose that the Fuchsian group G contains a parabolic element g. For example, the element t ∈ SL(2,Z) where

is a parabolic element. Note that all parabolic elements of SL(2,C) are conjugate to this element. That is, if g ∈ SL(2,Z) is parabolic, then  for some h ∈ SL(2,Z). 

The set

where H is the upper half-plane has

for any  where  is understood to mean the group generated by g.  That is, γ acts properly discontinuously on U. Because of this, it can be seen that the projection of U onto H/G is thus

.

Here, E is called the neighborhood of the cusp corresponding to g. 

Note that the hyperbolic area of E is exactly 1, when computed using the canonical Poincaré metric.  This is most easily seen by example: consider the intersection of U defined above with the fundamental domain 

of the modular group, as would be appropriate for the choice of T as the parabolic element.  When integrated over the volume element

the result is trivially 1.  Areas of all cusp neighborhoods are equal to this, by the invariance of the area under conjugation.

Hyperbolic geometry
Riemann surfaces